"Give It 2 U" is a song by American singer-songwriter Robin Thicke from his sixth studio album, Blurred Lines (2013). It was written and produced by Dr. Luke and Cirkut, with additional writing by Thicke, the featured artist Kendrick Lamar, and will.i.am. Originally titled "Give It to Me", a demo version of the song premiered on the radio show Sway in the Morning on May 2, 2013. Featuring guest vocals from Lamar, it was released as the third single from the album on August 27, 2013. "Give It 2 U" is an uptempo hip hop and electropop song with elements of dubstep. Lyrically, Thicke sings about sexually pleasing a partner.

The song received mixed reviews, with some music critics praising it as one of the best tracks from Blurred Lines, while others criticized it for its overt sexual lyrics. However, Lamar's verse in the song was lauded by many critics. "Give It 2 U" achieved moderate success on the charts internationally, receiving more success than the prior single "For the Rest of My Life". The song became a top 40 hit in Australia, Belgium, Canada, Germany, New Zealand, Scotland, the United Kingdom, and the United States. It peaked at number 45 on both of Billboards Hot R&B/Hip-Hop Songs and Rhythmic year-end charts.

An accompanying music video for "Give It 2 U" premiered on August 23, 2013. Directed by Diane Martel, the video was commissioned for a remix of the song, featuring Lamar and an additional verse by 2 Chainz. The video portrays Thicke as a referee, as several dance teams and floats surround him on a football field. The video was met with mixed reception. The song was promoted at the 2013 MTV Video Music Awards alongside Lamar, 2 Chainz, and Miley Cyrus, following a highly controversial performance of "Blurred Lines". It was also regularly performed during Thicke's debut headlining tour, the Blurred Lines Tour (2014).

Background and recording

The song was written and produced by Dr. Luke, and Cirkut, with additional writing by Thicke, Kendrick Lamar and will.i.am. It was written in approximately an hour, with Thicke striving to write a carefree song that is "straight to the dancefloor, straight to the sexy". When discussing the song, Thicke described it as "very Michael Jackson, Prince but also pretty hip-hop. It’s a big, shiny pop record. It’s fun". Thicke originally reached out to 2 Chainz to record a verse for the song, although his management had also simultaneously sent the song out to Kendrick Lamar.  Both rappers expressed interest in appearing on the song, resulting in a demo entitled "Give It to Me". On May 2, 2013, Thicke premiered this demo on the radio show Sway in the Morning. However, this version of the song was later relegated to a remix on the deluxe edition of Blurred Lines (2013), with the album version only featuring Lamar.

"Give It 2 U" was recorded at Luke's in the Boo, Record Plant Studios, and TDE Red Room Studios in Malibu, Los Angeles, and Carson, respectively.

Composition and remixes
"Give It 2 U" is an electropop and hip hop song featuring elements of dubstep.

Lyrically, the song discusses Thicke's desire to sexually please a partner. Speaking on the lyric "Big dick for ya, let me give it to ya", Thicke explained that it was "more a comment of swagger. Like, I'm big-dick swingin'".

A remix version for the song, featuring an additional verse from 2 Chainz, was made available as one of the bonus tracks on the deluxe edition of Blurred Lines (2013). Another version, the "Norman Doray & Rob Adans Remix", was released in 2013.

Critical reception
Rob Tannenbaum of Rolling Stone praised the song, citing it as one of the parent album's "cheeky impersonations of dubstep". Andrew Chan of Slant Magazine criticized the sexual lyrics of the song, citing it as a low point on the album. Sophie Schillaci of The Hollywood Reporter criticized the song's sexual lyrical content, claiming that "In the wake of Robin Thicke’s “Blurred Lines” controversy (and wild success), the singer is giving his critics some fresh ammo".

Chart performance
In the United States, "Give It 2 U" debuted at number 83 on the Billboard Hot 100 chart for the issue dated September 7, 2013. The song spent a total of 12 weeks on the chart, peaking at number 25 for the issue dated September 14, 2013. On the Dance Club Songs and Mainstream Top 40 charts, the song peaked at number 21 and 13, respectively. The song reached the top ten on both the Hot R&B/Hip-Hop Songs and Rhythmic charts, peaking at number 7 and 6, respectively. It also reached the number 45 position on the year-end versions of both charts.

Music video
Background
The music video was directed by Diane Martel in Los Angeles, California and premiered on August 23, 2013 on MTV. Rather than the album version, the video was produced for the remix of "Give It 2 U" featuring both Kendrick Lamar and 2 Chainz. It features appearances by three models including Alana Greszatai, Jessica Strother, and Mallory Llewellyn, all of whom are termed the "Luxury Girls" in the video. Three American dance teams, including The Passionettes, The Stingettes, and The Baker Girls, also made an appearance in the video. Before its release, MTV News reported that it was set on a football field, noting that "Thicke and Lamar [are] riding around on mini trucks with women on their laps". In the video, Thicke wore gold-rimmed sunglasses and a golden whistle, while alternating between a black suit jacket and a black-and-white striped suit, with the latter in reference to the referee outfit he wore during his performance at the 2013 MTV Video Music Awards. When speaking on working with Martel, Thicke said,
It's a Diane Martel dream, and I'm just happy to be here. The thing about Diane Martel that makes it so amazing — besides just being a crazy genius — is that she combines all different parts of the world into one soup. She takes the cotton candy, she takes the beautiful football-playing girls and she mixes it all up into one beautiful pot. So we're all very lucky to have her and excited to be working with her again

Synopsis and reception
The video is set on a football field and features a cameo by Thicke's son, Julian Fuego, as well as college dance teams from Albany State University and Alabama State University. Several dancers called "Luxury Girls" are shown dressed up like bottles of champagne, rolls of $100 bills and tins of caviar with others holding up Paper Mache models of lobsters, sushi and other luxurious foods. 2 Chainz enters the field leading a parade float labelled the "Ass Float" while Kendrick enters on a miniature car. The video ends with every girl dancing to the song with Robin Thicke.

Carrie Battan of Pitchfork praised the video, referring to it as "valiant effort to top the mania induced by 'Blurred Lines'". Lacey Seidman of VH1 described the video a "delight", commenting that Thicke "unleashes an arsenal of fun foolishness in the Diane Martel-directed video".

Live performances
Thicke performed the song at the 2013 MTV Video Music Awards in a medley alongside "Blurred Lines" and Miley Cyrus's "We Can't Stop". Kendrick Lamar and 2 Chainz accompanied Thicke, performing their verses from the remixed version of the song. Phillip Mlynar of MTV News described the performance as having a "football referee–themed vibe", as Thicke donned a black-and-white stripped suit with cheerleader-themed dancers surrounding him. "Give It 2 U" was regularly performed as the opening number on Thicke's debut headlining tour, the Blurred Lines Tour (2014).

In popular culture
Media
The song appears during the party scene in the third episode of season one ("Girl, Interrupted") of The CW television series The Tomorrow People.
The song was also featured in the 2015 comedy film Ted 2.

Track listings and formatsCD Single"Give It 2 U" (featuring Kendrick Lamar) – 3:50
"Give It 2 U" (No Rap Version) – 2:56Digital download (Remix)"Give It 2 U" (Remix) (featuring Kendrick Lamar & 2 Chainz) – 4:17Digital download (U.S. Mix)"Give It 2 U" (U.S. Mix) (featuring Kendrick Lamar) – 3:49Digital download (Remix)'
"Give It 2 U" (Norman Doray & Rob Adans Remix Radio Edit) (featuring Kendrick Lamar) – 3:54

Credits and personnel
 Robin Thicke – writer, vocals
 Kendrick Lamar – writer, vocals
 will.i.am – writer, vocal production
 Dr. Luke – writer, producer, all instruments, programming
 Cirkut – writer, producer, all instruments, programming
 Serban Ghenea – mixing
 Derek "MixedByAli" Ali – engineering, recording
 Clint Gibbs – engineering
 Padraic "Padlock" Kerin – engineering
 Rachael Findlen – assistant engineer
 Dustin Capulong – assistant engineer
 Irene Richter – production coordination
 John Hanes – engineered for mix

Credits and personnel adapted from "Give It 2 U" CD single liner notes.

Chart performance

Weekly charts

Year-end charts

Certifications

Release history

References

External links
 
 

2013 singles
2013 songs
Robin Thicke songs
Songs written by Robin Thicke
Kendrick Lamar songs
Songs written by Kendrick Lamar
Song recordings produced by Dr. Luke
Music videos directed by Diane Martel
Songs written by Dr. Luke
Song recordings produced by Cirkut (record producer)
Interscope Records singles
Songs written by Cirkut (record producer)
Songs written by 2 Chainz
Songs written by will.i.am